The FIL World Luge Natural Track Championships 2011 took place 26–30 January in Umhausen, Austria.

Men's singles
Run 1 took place after the second run of the women's single event after 18:30 CET on 29 January. For 30 January, run 2 took place at 10:30 CET while the third and final run took place after the third and final run of the women's single event after 12:30 CET.

Women's singles
Run 1 took place after the first run of the men's doubles' event at 10:30 CET on 29 January while run 2 took place on 18:30 CET that same day. The third and final run took place at 12:30 CET the following day.

Men's doubles
Both runs took place on 29 January.

Mixed team
This event took place on 28 January.

Medal table

Notes and references

FIL 2010-11 Natural Track World Cup Schedule. - accessed 25 July 2010.
Official website 
Men's doubles natural track World Champions
Men's singles natural track World Champions
Mixed teams natural track World Champions
Women's singles natural track World Champions

FIL World Luge Natural Track Championships
2011 in Austrian sport
2011 in luge
Luge in Austria